From Patrice to Lumumba is a 2019 independent documentary story of Patrice Lumumba, written by Patrick Kabeya. This film chronicles the story of Patrice Lumumba, the first prime minister of the Democratic Republic of Congo and one of the faces associated with the country's liberation after Belgian colonization.

The film focuses on Lumumba's last letter to his wife Pauline. In the letter Lumumba keeps a militant tone but also reveals a more private side of the man, yet to be shown before. This story, mainly told in his own words, gives Lumumba back the humanity he was not afforded throughout his career.

The film premiered in April 2019 at the Festival international du film Panafricain de Cannes.

The film was nominated for the Flemish Commission For UNESCO for Best African Documentary for 2020.

References

External links
 
 

2019 films
Canadian documentary films
Documentary films about African politics
Works about the Democratic Republic of the Congo
Documentary films about the Democratic Republic of the Congo
Documentary films about revolutionaries
Cultural depictions of Patrice Lumumba
2019 documentary films
French-language Canadian films
2010s Canadian films